Eduard Isabekyan (November 8, 1914 – August 17, 2007) was an Armenian painter, founder of thematic compositional genre in Armenia.

Biography

2007 – August 17 Eduard Isabekyan died. Buried in Komitas Pantheon

A separate hall is allotted to Eduard Isabekyan's permanent exhibition in The National Gallery of Armenia (total number of his works retained there is 121). His paintings are stored in many prestigious museums and private collections.

Eduard Isabekyan was elected as an honorary chairman of "Iğdır" patriotic union for the term of his life. During his lifetime the Municipality of Yerevan made a decision to establish a permanent exhibition hall (gallery) for Isabekyan's art. The Eduard Isabekyan Gallery opened on 3 May 2013- at 7a, Mashtots Avenue, in Yerevan.

Career, works 

Eduard Isabekyan was the founder of thematic compositional genre in Armenia. The basis of his art is the history of Armenian nation and its future, its proud posture and the ecstatic potential. Isabekyan's works of thematic compositional genre are the achievement of Armenian fine art of the Soviet period. "Young David" (1956, The National Gallery of Armenia), "The Revolt of Haghpat Peasants in 1903" (1957), "Reply to Hazkert" (1960, The National Gallery of Armenia) and other paintings distinguish by their monumental expressiveness, dynamic composition and civic resonance.

A number of Isabekyan's paintings are characterized by organic intercourse of a man and the native nature: "Old Man from Byurakan and the Artavazik Church" (1956), "Aksel Bakunts" (1956), "Derenik Demirtchyan" (1960), "Curly Boy" (1964), "Sayat Nova" (1964). One of the best examples of Armenian portraiture of Soviet period is the "Mother’s portrait" painting (1944).

The thematic center of his landscapes is the epic description of Armenian nature, ancient fortresses and temples: "In the Canyon of Tatev" (1959), "The Oxen Crossing the River by the Bridge" (1959), "Khndzoresk" (1962).

Many paintings are distinguished by artistic saturation: "Horovel" (1956, The National Gallery of Armenia), "Near the well" ("They didn’t come back", 1965), vIn the shade of the treesv (1966), "Artavazd’s death" (1966). The illustrations of Derenik Demirchian’s "Vardananq" and Sero Khanzadyan’s "Mkhitar Sparapet" novels are also commonly known.

Isabekyan was the author of a number of drawings and the series of graphics devoted to painter Arpenik Nalbandyan.

Exhibitions 

1931 – Exhibition of young Armenian artists
1935 – "House of Red army" presented several graphic compositions (sketches of meetings, a self-portrait) 
1943 – Exhibited his works that were accomplished during the army in Armenia and Moscow 
1947 – 1st Personal exhibition,Yerevan, Armenia
1964 – Personal exhibition celebrating his 50th birthday
1965 – Personal exhibition in Tbilisi and Bulgaria
1967 – Participated in exhibition in Montreal
1970 – "Urartu till today" exhibition, Paris 
1974 – Morocco, personal exhibition
1988 – Personal exhibition, Central House of Artists, Moscow
2004 – Personal exhibition, Artists' Union of Armenia, Yerevan
2006 - Personal exhibition, "Academy" Gallery, Yerevan
2014 – Personal exhibition (devoted to the 100th anniversary of Edurad Isabekyan) National Gallery of Armenia, Yerevan

Awards 

1956 – Announced the honored worker of arts
1963 – Announced the People's Painter of Armenia
2001 – Is awarded the "Mesrop Mashtots" medal by the Armenian Catholicos
2002 – Becomes an honorable citizen of Yerevan
2004 – Is awarded the "St.Sahak-St.Mesrop" medal by the Armenian Catholicos

See also
List of Armenian artists
List of Armenians
Culture of Armenia

References

External links

 
 Official site
 Էդվարդ Իսաբեկյան. Աշնանային նատյուրմորտ
 ԷդուարդԻսաբեկյան
 Կտավները նվիրեց Երևանին
 Երևանում բացվեց Էդուարդ Իսաբեկյանի ցուցասրահը։
 Էդուարդ Իսաբեկյան
 Բոհեմ
 Էդուարդ Իսաբեկյան. Աշնանային նատյուրմորտ
 Էդուարդ Իսաբեկյանի արվեստը
 ՆԿԱՐԻՉԸ՝ Էդուարդ Իսաբեկյան
 «ԷդուարդԻսաբեկյանըևաշակերտները» ցուցահանդեսիբացում

1914 births
2007 deaths
20th-century Armenian painters
People from Iğdır
Tbilisi State Academy of Arts alumni
Recipients of the Order of the Red Banner of Labour
Armenians from the Ottoman Empire
Armenian painters
Soviet painters
Burials at the Komitas Pantheon